The 2023 Arnold Clark Cup was the second edition of the Arnold Clark Cup, an invitational women's association football tournament hosted by The Football Association, held from 16 to 22 February 2023.

England won the tournament for the second time with three wins from three games.

Format
The four invited teams played each other once in a round-robin tournament. Points awarded in the group stage followed the formula of three points for a win, one point for a draw, and zero points for a loss.

Venues
Matches were played as double-headers at three venues across England.

Teams

Squads

Standings

Results
All times are local (UTC±0)

Goalscorers

References

External links
Official website

2023
Arnold Clark Cup
2022–23 in English women's football
February 2023 sports events in the United Kingdom
Football in England